Miss Ecuador 1955 was the 1st edition of the Miss Ecuador pageant since 1930 when Sara Chacón Zúñiga from Guayas was elected as the very first winner of the contest. The election was held on June 4, 1955 where Leonor Carcache from Guayas took the crown. The winner represented Ecuador at Miss Universe 1955.

Results

Placements

Special awards

Contestants

Notes

Debuts

References

External links
Official Miss Ecuador website

1955 beauty pageants
Beauty pageants in Ecuador
Miss Ecuador